Martin Hartmann (9 December 1851, Breslau – 5 December 1918, Berlin) was a German orientalist, who specialized in Islamic studies.

In 1875, he received his doctorate at the University of Leipzig as a student of Heinrich Leberecht Fleischer. From 1876 to 1887 he served as a dragoman at the German General Consulate in Beirut. From 1887 until his death in 1918 he taught classes at the Department of Oriental Languages in Berlin.

As a professor in Berlin he strove hard for the recognition of Islamic studies as an independent discipline. His numerous contributions to the field of Islamic studies were based on a sociological standpoint. Many of these works were published in the journal "Die Welt des Islams" (The World of Islam), a publication of the "Deutsche Gesellschaft für Islamkunde", an organization that Hartmann was a co-founder of in 1912.

The Arab author Shakib Arslan strongly criticized and pushed back against Hartmann for his views on Islam and his writings on the Muslims of China.

Selected works 
 
 Metrum und Rhythmus: Die Entstehung der arabischen Vermasse, 1896.
 Lieder der libyschen Wüste, 1899.
 "The Arabic press of Egypt", published in English in 1899. 
 Der islamische Orient; Berichte und Forschungen (3 volumes, 1905–10).
 Chinesisch-Turkestan: Geschichte, Verwaltung, Geistesleben, und Wirtschaft, 1907.
 Der Islam: Geschichte -- Glaube -- Recht. Ein Handbuch, 1909.
 Islam, Mission, Politik, 1911.
 Zur Geschichte des Islam in China, 1921.

References 

1851 births
1918 deaths
Writers from Wrocław
Leipzig University alumni
German orientalists